Gentian Zenelaj (born 13 August 1977) is an Albanian actor and comedian mostly known  by his appearance in Portokalli (2004-2007) and in Apartment 2XL (2008–2013). He began his career in 2004 in the show Portokalli with the group ShBLSh, when this group was the most preferred sketch in all shows. After 4 season in Portokalli the group ShBLSh broke up and anyone go in their procupetions.  After three seasons on Apartment 2XL, the show was canceled, but with the same actors the producer and TV broadcaster created the Sketch Show Albania. Sketch Show aired for two seasons, but this show did not succeed. Then the show changed again on Apartment 2XL and now is airing his sixth season.

Filmography
Gentian Zenelaj is known for playing in movies. Two movies that he played are Gjalle! (English. Alive!) (2009), and Koha e Kometes (English. Time of the Comet) (2008).

References

Living people
Albanian male actors
1977 births